Kristina Maria Fröjmark (1957–2004) was a Swedish reality show contestant  after her appearance in the show Farmen-Skärgården, where she was one of the twelve contestants who ran a farm in Stockholm archipelago; the reality show was broadcast on TV4. Fröjmark got a lot of attention in Swedish media for her jet set life and wealth and on the show, she would speak much of her life as a stay-at-home wife.

Death 
Fröjmark, her husband Björn and their two children drowned after being struck by the tsunami during their vacation in Khao Lak, Thailand on 26 December 2004. The last sign of them was a short message sent the day before.

References

External links

Phuket Tsunami Disaster Forum – The Fröjmark family missing

Participants in Swedish reality television series
1957 births
2004 deaths
Deaths by drowning
Natural disaster deaths in Thailand
Victims of the 2004 Indian Ocean earthquake and tsunami
The Farm (TV series) contestants
Date of birth missing
Place of birth missing